The 2020–21 Scottish League Two was the 26th season in the current format of 10 teams in the fourth-tier of Scottish football. The season commenced later than usual on 17 October, being played over a shortened 27-game period due to the Coronavirus pandemic. 

The bottom team entered a two-legged play-off against the winners of the Pyramid play-off between the Highland League and Lowland League champions, determine which team competes in League Two in the 2021–22 season.

Ten teams contested the league: Albion Rovers, Annan Athletic, Brechin City, Cowdenbeath, Edinburgh City, Elgin City, Queen's Park, Stenhousemuir, Stirling Albion and Stranraer.

On 11 January 2021, the league was suspended for three weeks due to the COVID-19 pandemic. On 29 January 2021, the suspension was extended until at least 14 February. In March 2021, the Scottish Government gave permission for the league to resume. On 4 March, League One and Two clubs proposed shortening the season to 22 matches, with each team playing all other teams twice, followed by a split in the table to determine the final four matches. The clubs suggested a restart date of 20 March, which was approved by the SPFL.

Teams
The following teams changed division after the 2019–20 season.

To League Two
Relegated from League One
 Stranraer

From League Two
Promoted to League One
 Cove Rangers

Stadia and locations

Personnel and kits

Managerial changes

League summary

League table

Results
Teams play each other two times, making a total of 90 games, with each team playing 18, the league then splits in half for a further 4 matches. This was reduced from the normal 36 due to the coronavirus pandemic.

Matches 1–18

Post-Split Fixtures (Matches 19–22)

Top half

Bottom half

Season statistics

Scoring

Top scorers

Source:

Hat-tricks

Attendances
Games were mostly played behind closed doors due to the COVID-19 pandemic. Limited attendance was allowed at some grounds with strict conditions under the Scottish Government Tier system, dependent on the club's geographical location.

Awards

League Two play-offs
On 9 April the SPFL announced that a decision on whether the 2020–21 play-offs would proceed would be taken on 19 April. Brechin City chairman Ken Ferguson resigned from the SPFL board on 9 April and was replaced by Clyde representative Gordon Thomson, as Brechin sat bottom of the League Two table and would potentially be affected by the decision on whether the play-offs should proceed. The SPFL said on 9 April it would have to determine whether Brora and Kelty met league membership criteria, and noted that they had been declared champions based on curtailed seasons while it was not yet certain that League Two would complete its season. The SPFL confirmed on 29 April that the play-offs would proceed.

The Pyramid play-off was contested between the champions of the 2020–21 Highland Football League (Brora Rangers) and the 2020–21 Lowland Football League (Kelty Hearts). Both clubs were also crowned their regional league champions in the 2019–20 season, but the promotion/relegation playoff was cancelled due to the COVID-19 pandemic. 

Kelty won 6–1 on aggregate and then faced the bottom club (Brechin City) in the League Two play-off final, being promoted to League Two for the 2021–22 season after a 3–1 aggregate win. As Brechin City lost the play-off, they were relegated to the Highland League since they were north of 56.4513N latitude (middle of the Tay Road Bridge).

Pyramid play-off

First leg

Second leg

Final

First leg

Second leg

References

External links
Official website

Scottish League Two seasons
4
4
Scot
Scottish League Two